Philipp Bargfrede (born 3 March 1989) is a German professional footballer who plays as a midfielder for Werder Bremen II.

Career

TuS Heeslingen
Bargfrede joined the Heeslingen youth system at the age of 6, in 1995. He stayed with them until 2004.

Werder Bremen
Bargfrede joined the Werder Bremen youth academy in 2004 and debuted for Werder Bremen II in 2007. On 1 July 2008, Bargfrede was offered a senior team contract. He picked up his first appearance for the senior team on 8 August 2009 in a 2–3 loss to Eintracht Frankfurt. He came on as a substitute in the 74th minute, replacing Tim Borowski. Since then, he has racked up over 150 appearances for the club. In March 2018, Werder Bremen announced that Bargfrede had signed a contract extension which included arrangements to keep him at the club after the end of his playing career.

In August 2020, Bargfrede was released by Werder Bremen after 16 years at the club. He stated his intention of returning to the club in the future in a non-playing role. However, on 24 October 2020, he re-signed for Werder on a one-year deal, joining the reserves. On 24 April 2021, he made his comeback for Werder's first team in the Bundesliga in a 3–1 defeat against Union Berlin. 

Alongside his playing career for Werder Bremen's reserve team, Bargfrede was also appointed assistant coach of the team in July 2021. A year later, in June 2022, Bargfrede took on a new role as assistant coach of the club's U17 team, still alongside his playing career.

Personal life

His father, Hans-Jürgen Bargfrede, played for FC St. Pauli in the German Bundesliga. His brother, Bent Bargfrede, plays for Heeslingen.

Career statistics

References

External links
 Philipp Bargfrede at Werder.de 
 
 

Living people
1989 births
German footballers
Association football midfielders
Germany under-21 international footballers
TuS Heeslingen players
SV Werder Bremen players
SV Werder Bremen II players
Bundesliga players
3. Liga players